Kranjčar is a Croatian surname. Notable people with the surname include:

 Zlatko Kranjčar (1956–2021), Croatian footballer and manager
 Niko Kranjčar (born 1984), Croatian footballer, son of Zlatko

Croatian surnames